The 2020–21 season of the Hoofdklasse was played in four leagues, two for Saturday and two for Sunday. The champions of each league were to be promoted directly to the Derde Divisie; other teams could have been  promoted through play-offs. The 2020–21 Hoofdklasse started on Saturday 29 August 2020 and ended abruptly on 24 February 2021.

Effects of the 2020 coronavirus pandemic 
During the previous season, on 31 March 2020, the KNVB decided to cancel all competitions at amateur level. They also decided, for those competitions involved, there would be no final standings, and therefore no champions, initially no promotions and no relegations.

On 26 May, former Derde Divisie club ONS Sneek was granted a voluntary demotion to the Hoofdklasse for financial reasons.

Later on 12 June, the KNVB officially announced that the Derde Divisie would again consist of 36 teams in 2020–21. This was one wish of CVTD, the interest group of football clubs from the Tweede and Derde Divisies. To fill vacancies and accommodate all teams that led their groups in the Hoofdklasse after the cancellation, the KNVB decided to make each Derde Divisie group have 18 teams. The Hoofdklasse group leaders, namely Sportlust '46, Staphorst, Unitas and Hollandia, therefore moved up to the Derde Divisie. The best runners-up of the Saturday and Sunday Hoofdklasse, Asser Christelijke Voetbalvereniging (ACV) and JOS Watergraafsmeer respectively, were also promoted.

Meppeler Sport Club and Quick '20 withdrew from Sunday football to compete instead in its Saturday counterpart. As a result this season started with almost the same teams as the previous one.

On 24 February 2021, the KNVB eventually discontinued ongoing category A senior competitions, including Hoofdklasse, again without promotion or relegation.

Play-offs

Promotion 
In each competition teams play periods of 10 games, three times per season (30 games per season). After each period the best team which has not yet qualified earns a spot in the play-offs for the Derde Divisie as the period champion. 6 teams from the Saturday Hoofdklasse play against 2 teams from the Saturday Derde Divisie for 2 promotion spots. The teams from the Sunday leagues do the same.

Relegation 
The teams in place 13 and 14 at the end of the season fight against relegation in the relegation play-offs. They face the period champions of the Eerste Klasse.

Saturday A

Teams 

>> Competition cancelled, what's listed below is the situation on 10 October 2020, the date the last matches were played.<<

Standings

Fixtures/results

Saturday B

Teams 

>> Competition cancelled, what's listed below is the situation on 10 October 2020, the date the last matches were played.<<

Standings

Fixtures/results

Sunday A

Teams 

>> Competition cancelled, what's listed below is the situation on 11 October 2020, the date the last matches were played.<<

Standings

Fixtures/results

Sunday B

Teams 

>> Competition cancelled, what's listed below is the situation on 11 October 2020, the date the last matches were played.<<

Standings

Fixtures/results

References 

Vierde Divisie seasons
Hoofdklasse
Netherlands
Netherlands